This is a list of lakes (including reservoirs) in the United States, grouped by state.

By state

Alabama

 Edgewood Lake

Alaska

 Agiak Lagoon
 Nelson Lake

Arizona

Arkansas

California

 Beck Lakes
 Kinman Pond
 Sinaloa Lake

Colorado

Connecticut

 Amston Lake
 Ashford Lake
 Aspetuck Reservoir
 Bantam Lake (largest natural lake in Connecticut)
 Barkhamsted Reservoir
 Lake Beseck
 Breakneck Pond
 Candlewood Lake (largest lake in Connecticut)
 Lake Chaffee
 Converse Lake
 Deer Lake
 Lake Forest
 Lake Gaillard
 Gardner Lake
 Great Hollow Lake
 Lake Hayward
 Higganum Reservoir
 Highland Lake
 Hop Brook Lake
 Killingly Pond
 Lake Lillinonah
 Mansfield Hollow Lake
 Mashapaug Lake
 Pinewood Lake
 Lake Pocotopaug
 Quaddick Reservoir
 Lake Quassapaug
 Round Pond
 Lake Saltonstall
 Saugatuck Reservoir
 Shenipsit Lake
 Squantz Pond
 Lake Success
 Tuxis Pond
 Twin Lakes
 Lake Waramaug
 West Hartford Reservoir
 West Thompson Lake
 Wetherell Pond
 Lake Whitney
 Lake Zoar

Delaware

Hoopes Reservoir
Lums Pond (largest lake in Delaware)
Lake Comegys
Silver Lake
Moores Lake

Florida

 Lake Alice
 Lake Altamaha
 Lake Angelo
 Lake Apopka
 Lake Aurora
 Lake Bennet
 Lake Broward
 Bonnet Lake
 Blue Cypress Lake
 Lake Center
 Lake Clay
 Counterfeit Lake
 Lake Crescent
 Lake Damon
 Dance Lake
 Lake Denton
 Dinner Lake
 Lake Dot
 Lake Easy
 Lake Effie
 Engineers Lake
 Lake Eva
 Lake Florence
 Lake Francis
 Lake George
 Lake Gross
 Lake Harney
 Lake Harris
 Lake Horney
 Lake Iamonia
 Lake Ina
 Lake Isis
 Lake Istokpoga
 Lake June in Winter
 Lake Katherine
 Lake Kissimmee
 Lake Lelia
 Lake Letta
 Lochloosa Lake
 Lake Lotta
 Lake Lucas
 Mallard Lake
 Lake Mariam
 Lake Mary
 Lake Mary Jane
 Lake Maude
 Lake McCoy
 Moody Lake
 Mountain Lodge Lake
 Lake Okeechobee (largest lake in Florida)
 Pabor Lake
 Padgett Lake
 Park Lake
 Lake Placid
 Lake Poinsett
 Lake Rachael
 Red Lake
 Lake Reed
 Lake Ring
 Lake Rousseau
 Sawgrass Lake
 Lake Seminole (extends into Georgia)
 Silver Lake
 Lake Sirena
 Lake Streety
 Sunset Lake
 Lake Tarpon
 Lake Tohopekaliga
 Tower Lakes
 Valkaria Lake
 Lake Verona
 Lake Viola
 Lake Washington
 Lake Weaver
 Lake Weir
 Lake Winder
 Lake Yale

Georgia

 Lake Allatoona
 Lake Arrowhead
 Lake Blackshear
 Lake Blue Ridge 
 Lake Burton
 Carters Lake
 Chatuge Lake (extends into North Carolina)
 Chief McIntosh Lake
 Coleman Pond
 Davenport Lake
 Gannet Lake
 Goat Rock Lake
 Lake Harding (extends into Alabama)
 Lake Hartwell (extends into South Carolina)
 Hard Labor Creek Regional Reservoir
 Houston Lake (Georgia)
 Lot Pond
 Lake Jackson
 Lake Jodeco 
 Lake Lanier
 Lake Nottely
 Lake Oconee:)
 Old Hell Lake
 Lake Oliver
 Lake Peachtree
 Pilcher Pond
 Lake Rabun
 Lake Seminole (extends into Florida)
 Lake Sinclair
 Lake Spivey
 Lake Strom Thurmond (extends into South Carolina. Largest lake in Georgia)
 Tallulah Falls Lake
 Taylors Lake
 Lake Tugalo (extends into South Carolina)
 Walter F. George Lake (extends into Alabama)
 West Point Lake (extends into Alabama)

Hawaii

 Āliapa'akai (Salt Lake), in the Honolulu neighborhood of Salt Lake, Hawaii
 Alieiki Lake
 Green Lake (Hawaii) (formerly Wai a Pele) (destroyed on 2 June 2018 by an eruption)
 Hālaliʻi Lake (largest lake in Hawaii)
 Halulu Lake (largest natural lake in Hawaii)
 Ka Loko Reservoir
 Keālia Pond
 Loʻe Lake
 Loko Paakai
 Meyer Lake
 Nonopapa Lake
 Violet Lake (also known as Kiʻowaiokihawahine)
 Lake Waiau
 Lake Wilson (Oahu)

Idaho

 Bear Lake (extends into Utah)
 Brush Lake
 Lake Cascade 
 Lake Coeur d'Alene
 Governor’s Punch Bowl
 Grays Lake
 Henrys Lake
 Lake Lowell (part of the Deer Flat Upper Embankment  reservoir) 
 Lake Pend Oreille (largest lake in Idaho)
 Payette Lake
 Priest Lake
 Redfish Lake
 Stanley Lake

Illinois

 Whalon Lake

Indiana

Iowa

 Big Creek Lake (Iowa) 
 Black Hawk Lake 
 Carter Lake 
 Clear Lake
 Coralville Lake 
 East Okoboji Lake 
 Elm Lake (Iowa) 
 Five Island Lake 
 Goose Lake 
 Green Valley Lake (Iowa) 
 Hartwick Lake 
 High Lake (Iowa)   
 Lake Icaria 
 Iowa Lake
 Lost Island Lake 
 Lost Grove Lake
 Lake Manawa 
 Lake Morris 
 North Twin Lake 
 Lake Odessa (Iowa) 
 Okamanpeedan Lake 
 Rathbun Lake 
 Lake Red Rock (largest lake in Iowa)
 Rock Creek Lake 
 Rush Lake 
 Saylorville Lake 
 Silver Lake 
 Spirit Lake
 Storm Lake 
 Swan Lake
 Lake Syracuse (Iowa)
 Virgin Lake (Iowa) 
 Lake Wapello 
 Lake Wawasee (Iowa)
 West Okoboji Lake

Kansas

 Clinton Lake
 Fall River Lake
 Lake Inman (largest natural lake in Kansas)
 Marion County Lake
 Marion Reservoir
 Milford Lake (largest lake in Kansas)
 Perry Lake
 Pomona Lake
 Shawnee State Fishing Lake
 Tuttle Creek Lake
 Waconda Lake
 Wilson Lake

Kentucky

Louisiana

 Anacoco Lake
 Bay Long in  
 Bayou D'Arbonne Lake
 Lake Bistineau
 Black Lake (Louisiana) (also known as Black-Clear Lake in Natchitoches Parish)
 Black Bayou Reservoir located in Bossier Parish
 Bundick Lake near Dry Creek
 Caddo Lake (extends into Texas)
 Caillou Lake in Terrebonne Parish
 Calcasieu Lake
 Caney Creek Lake in Jackson Parish
 Carencro Lake in Terrebonne Parish
 Catahoula Lake
 Lake Cataouatche
 Lake Chicot in Evangeline Parish
 Lake Claiborne
 Clear Lake in Desoto Parish
 Cocodrie Lake
 Cotile Lake
 Cross Lake in Caddo Parish
 Cypress Lake
 Lake De Cade in Terrebonne Parish
 Dog Lake in Terrebonne Parish
 Eagle Lake
 False River: An (oxbow lake) in Pointe Coupee Parish
 Lake Fausse Pointe
 Lake Fields in Terrebonne Parish
 Flat Lake
 Grand Lake
 Grassy Lake (Louisiana)
 Indian Creek Reservoir
 Jug Lake in Terrebonne Parish
 John K. Kelly-Grand Bayou Reservoir in Red River Parish
 Kincaid Reservoir
 King Lake in Terrebonne Parish
 Lac des Allemands
 Lake Latt
 Lost Lake
 Lake Maurepas
 Lake Mechant in Terrebonne Parish
 Mountain Bayou Lake
 Mud Lake 
 Nantachie Lake
 Negro Lake
 Raccourci Old River (oxbow lake)
 Lake Pagie in Terrebonne Parish
 Lake Palourde
 Pelican Lake in Terrebonne Parish
 Lake Peigneur
 Lake Pontchartrain (largest water body within Louisiana, not a lake but a tidal estuary)
 Poverty Point Reservoir
 Lake Rodemacher in Rapides Parish
 Sabine Lake (extends into Texas)
 Saline Lake (with Chee Chee Bay in Winn Parish)
 Lake Salvador
 Six Mile Lake
 Spanish Lake in St. Martin and Iberia Parishes
 Toledo Bend Reservoir
 Vernon lake
 Lake Verret
 White Lake

Maine

 Threemile Pond

Maryland

Most lakes in the state today were constructed, mostly through dam construction. 
 Conowingo Reservoir
 Deep Creek Lake (largest lake in Maryland)
 Lake Habeeb (Rocky Gap Lake)
 Liberty Reservoir
 Loch Raven Reservoir
 Little Patuxent Oxbow Lake (at 50 acres, the largest natural freshwater lake in the state.) 
 Prettyboy Reservoir
 Youghiogheny River Lake (extends into Pennsylvania)
 Quarry Lake (one of the deepest lakes in the state of Maryland)

Massachusetts

 Lake Ashmere
 Lake Attitash
 Lake Boon
 Brooks Pond
 Lake Buel
 Cady Pond
 Lake Chaubunagungamaug
 Lake Cochichewick
 Lake Cochituate
 Lake Garfield
 Great Herring Pond
 Houghton's Pond
 Lewis Lake
 Mashpee Pond
 Lake Massapoag
 Lake Monomonac
 Lake Onota
 Pontoosuc Lake
 Prankers Pond
 Quabbin Reservoir (largest lake in Massachusetts)
 Lake Quannapowitt
 Lake Quinsigamond
 Lake Rico
 Lake Sabbatia
 Lake Saltonstall
 Spring Pond
 Tuxbury Pond
 Wakeby Pond
 Walden Pond
 Watson Pond
 Watuppa Ponds
 Wenham Lake
 Winnecunnet Pond
 Lake Wyola
  Greenwater pond

Michigan

Minnesota

 Fadden Lake
 Fish Lake Reservoir
 Five Lake
 Jim Cook Lake
 Little Coon Lake
 Little Elbow Lake
 Longyear Lake
 Lyendecker Lake
 Mahla Lake
 Malmedal Lake
 Mandall Lake
 Molly Stark Lake
 Monker Lake
 O'Dowd Lake
 Ogishkemuncie Lake
 Pay Lake
 Peysenske Lake
 Phare Lake
 Picard Lakes
 Plum Lake
 Rat House Lake
 Rat Root Lake
 Rutz Lake
 Sager Lake
 Schendel Lake
 Schilling Lake
 Schutz Lake
 Sellards Lake
 Seven Beaver Lake
 Severance Lake
 Shamineau Lake
 Sheas Lake
 Shields Lake
 Siseebakwet Lake
 Skataas Lake
 Skogman Lake
 Sugar Bush Lake
 Talcot Lake
 Toners Lake
 Tyler Lake
 Tyson Lake
 Vanose Lake
 Waboose Lake
 Warren Lake
 Wells Lake
 White Lily Lake
 White Stone Lake
 Wita Lake
 Winkler Lake

Mississippi

 Arkabutla Lake
 Lake Bill Waller
 Enid Lake
 Lake Ferguson
 Gainesville Lake
 Grenada Lake (largest lake in Mississippi)
 Hickory Hills Lake
 Marting Lake
 Moon Lake
 Ross Barnett Reservoir
 Sardis Lake
 Lake Tom Bailey
 Lake Washington

Missouri

 Amarugia Lake
 Atkinson Lake (Missouri)
 Bean Lake
 Big Lake
 Bilby Ranch Lake
 Binder Lake
 Blind Pony Lake
 Blue Springs Lake
 Bull Shoals Lake (extends into Arkansas)
 Bushwacker Lake
 Butterfly Lake
 Cameron City Lakes
 Che-Ru Lake
 Lake Clare
 Clearwater Lake
 Cooley Lake
 Cottontail Lake
 Fellows Lake
 Flight Lake
 Forest Lake
 Frisco Lake
 Lake Girardeau
 Halls Lake)
 Henry Sever Lake
 Hunnewell Lake
 Indian Creek Lake
 Kendzora Lake
 Little Compton Lake
 Little Dixie Lake
 Little Prairie Community Lake
 Longview Lake
 Lower Taum Sauk Lake
 Manito Lake
 Maple Leaf Lake
 Mark Twain Lake
 Lake Maurer
 McDaniel Lake
 Miller Community Lake
 Montrose Lake
 Nodaway County Lake
 Norfork Lake (extends into Arkansas)
 Lake of the Ozarks
 Lake Paho
 Perry County Community Lake
 Pomme de Terre Lake
 Pony Express Lake
 Ray County Community Lake
 Riss Lake
 Rocky Fork Lake
 Sears Community Lake
 Shawnee Mac Lakes
 Sims Valley Community Lake
 Smithville Lake
 Lake Springfield
 Lake St. Louis
 Stockton Lake
 Table Rock Lake (extends into Arkansas)
 Lake Taneycomo
 Thomas Hill Lake
 Tri-City Lake
 Truman Reservoir (largest lake in Missouri)
 Upper Big Lake
 Vandalia Lake
 Lake Viking
 Wappapello Lake
 Lake Waukomis
 Weatherby Lake
 Williams Creek Lake
 Wing Lake

Montana

Nebraska

Nevada

 Angel Lake
 Deep Creek Reservoir
 Humboldt Sink
 Lake Mead (extends into Arizona)
 Pyramid Lake
 Lake Tahoe (extends into California; largest lake in Nevada)
 Walker Lake

New Hampshire

New Jersey

 Alcyon Lake 
 Arrowhead Lake
 Blue Hole
 Budd Lake
 Carasaljo Lake
 Lake Carnegie
 Deal Lake
 Estling Lake
 Green Pond
 Greenwood Lake
 Indian Lake
 Longwood Lake
 Lake Grinnell
 Lake Hopatcong (largest lake in New Jersey)
 Lake Lefferts
 Makepeace Lake
 Muckshaw Ponds
 Lake Musconetcong
 White Meadow Lake
 Lake Rogerene
 Lake Shawnee
 Lake Tappan
 Shepherd Lake
 Spruce Run Lake

New Mexico

 Abiquiu Lake
 Bluewater Lake
 Bonito Lake
 Brantley Lake
 Caballo Lake
 Clayton Lake
 Conchas Lake
 El Vado Lake
 Elephant Butte Reservoir (largest lake in New Mexico)
 Fenton Lake
 Hackberry Lake
 Heron Lake
 Morphy Lake
 Navajo Lake
 Lake Roberts
 Santa Cruz Lake
 Santa Rosa Lake
 Stinking Lake
 Storrie Lake
 Summer Lake
 Ute Lake

New York

Cayuga Lake
 Luxton Lake
 Onondaga Lake
 Owasco Lake
 Seneca Lake (New York)
 Twin Pond

North Carolina

 Badin Lake
 Blewett Falls Lake
 Lake Brandt
 Lake Cammack
 Chatuge Lake (extends into Georgia)
 Falls Lake
 Lake Gaston (extends into Virginia)
 Graham-Mebane Lake (formerly Quaker Lake)
 Lake Hickory
 Lake Higgins
 High Rock Lake
 Hyco Lake
 Lake James
 Jordan Lake
 Kerr Lake (extends into Virginia)
 Lake Lure
 Lake Mackintosh
 Mayo Lake
 Mountain Island Lake
 Lake Norman (largest lake in North Carolina)
 Price Lake
 Randleman Lake
 Reidsville Lake
 Lake Tillery
 Lake Townsend
 Lake Toxaway
 Tuckertown Lake
 W. Kerr Scott Lake
 White Lake
 Lake Wylie

North Dakota

 Lake Arthur
 Alkali Lake
 Lake Ashtabula
 Court Lake
 Lake Darling
 Devils Lake
 Harker Lake
 Horsehead Lake
 Long Lake
 Lake Oahe 
 Rush Lake
 Lake Sakakawea  (largest lake in North Dakota)
 Sweetwater Lake
 Lake Tschida
 Upper Harker Lake

Ohio

 Highlandtown Lake

Oklahoma

 Altus City Reservoir
 Lake Altus-Lugert
 American Horse Lake
 Lake of the Arbuckles
 Arcadia Lake
 Ardmore City Lake
 Atoka Lake
 Bellcow Lake
 Birch Lake
 Lake Bixhoma
 Black Kettle Lake	
 Bluestem Lake
 Boomer Lake
 Broken Bow Lake
 Brushy Creek Reservoir
 Lake Burtschi
 Canton Lake
 Carl Albert Lake
 Carl Blackwell Lake
 Lake Carl Etling	
 Lake Carlton
 Carter Lake
 Cedar Lake
 Chandler Lake
 Lake Checotah
 Lake Chickasha
 Chouteau Lock and Dam
 Claremore Lake
 Clayton Lake
 Clear Creek Lake
 Cleveland City Lake
 Clinton Lake
 Coalgate City Lake
 Comanche Lake
 Copan Lake
 Cordell Reservoir
 Crowder Lake
 Cushing Municipal Lake
 Lake Dahlgren
 Dripping Springs Lake
 Lake Durant
 Lake El Reno
 Lake Ellsworth
 Lake Eucha
 Foss Reservoir
 Fort Cobb Reservoir
 Fort Supply Lake
 Fuqua Lake
 Grand Lake o' the Cherokees
 Great Salt Plains Lake
 Greenleaf Lake
 Guthrie Lake
 Heyburn Lake
 Lake Hudson (formerly named Markham Ferry Reservoir)
 Hulah Lake
 Lake Jean Neustadt
 Lake Jed Johnson
 Keystone Lake
 Konawa Reservoir
 Lake Lawtonka
 Liberty Lake
 Lloyd Church Lake	
 McGee Creek Reservoir
 Lake McMurtry
 Mountain Lake
 Lake Murray
 Nanih Waiyah Lake
 Oklahoma Lake
 Okmulgee Lake
 Lake Overholser
 Ozzie Cobb Lake
 Pauls Valley Lake
 Pine Creek Lake
 Lake R.C. Longmire
 Raymond Gary Lake
 Rock Creek Reservoir
 Shawnee Twin Lakes
 Skiatook Lake
 Sooner Lake
 Lake Spavinaw
 Sportsman Lake
 Lake Stanley Draper
 Lake Talequah
 Lake Thunderbird
 Tom Steed Reservoir
 W.D. Mayo Lock and Dam
 Lake W. R. Holway
 Waurika Lake
 Lake Wayne Wallace	
 Webbers Falls Reservoir
 Wes Watkins Reservoir
 Wewoka Lake
 Lake Wister
 Lake Yahola

Oregon

Pennsylvania

 Fairview Lake

Rhode Island

South Carolina

 Alcohol and Drug Abuse Lake
 Lake Bowen
 Broadway Lake
 Lake Craig
 Lake Cunningham
 Lake Greenwood
 Lake Hartwell (extends into Georgia)
 Lake Jocassee
 Lake Keowee
 Lake Marion (largest lake in South Carolina)
 Lake Moultrie
 Lake Murray
 Lake Oak Grove
 Lake Oliphant
 Lake Ollenoy
 Lake Rabon
 Lake Robinson
 Lake Russell
 Saluda Lake
 Lake Secession
 Lake Strom Thurmond (also called Clarks Hill; extends into Georgia)
 Lake Thicketty
 Lake Tugalo (extends into Georgia)
 Lake Warren
 Lake Wateree
 Lake Welchel
 Lake Wylie

South Dakota

 Mutske Lake
 Piyas Lake
 Simpson Lake
 Wigdale Lake

Former Lakes of South Dakota
 Simpson Lake (South Dakota)

Tennessee

 Lake Barkley (extends into Kentucky)
 Boone Lake
 Calderwood Lake
 Center Hill Lake
 Cherokee Lake
 Chickamauga Lake
 Chilhowee Lake
 Dale Hollow Reservoir
 Davy Crockett Lake 
 Douglas Lake
 Fort Loudoun Lake
 Fort Patrick Henry Lake
 Lake Graham
 J. Percy Priest Lake
 Kentucky Lake (extends into Kentucky)
 Larry Collins Lake
 Melton Hill Lake
 Nickajack Lake
 Norris Lake
 Ocoee Lake
 Old Hickory Lake
 Reelfoot Lake
 Tellico Lake
 Tims Ford Lake
 Watauga Lake
 Watts Bar Lake (largest lake in Tennessee)
 Wilbur Lake (Tennessee)

Texas

Utah

 Bear Lake
 Blue Lake
 Lake Bonneville
 Cecret Lake
 Cliff Lake
 Crescent Lake
 Cuberant Lake
 Cuddyback Lake
 Cutthroat Lake
 Cyclone Lake
 Cys Cache
 Cyclone Lake
 Davis Lakes
 Dead Lake
 Deadman Lake
 Dean Lake
 Dog Lake (Brighton)
 Dog Lake (Mount Aire)
 Emerald Lake
 Fish Lake
 Great Salt Lake
 Jordan Lake
 Lake Powell,  USBR (KTN+SS)
 Little Salt Lake
 Mirror Lake
 Navajo Lake
 Oowah Lake
 Rush Lake
 Sevier Lake
 Tony Grove Lake
 Utah Lake

Vermont

Virginia

 Lovill's Creek Lake

Washington

 Blackmans Lake
 Fiander Lake
 Ipsoot Lake
 Kettling Lake
 Lamar Lake
 Lake Lucinda
 Lake Marcel
 Monogram Lake
 Ohop Lake
 Pitman Lake
 Setchfield Lake
 Sunwood Lake
 Waddell Lake

West Virginia

Wisconsin

 Potato Lake
 Two Sisters Lake

Wyoming

 Lake Alice
 Bradley Lake
 Emma Matilda Lake
 Flaming Gorge Reservoir (extends into Utah)
 Jackson Lake
 Jenny Lake
 Leigh Lake
 Phelps Lake
 Lake Solitude
 String Lake
 Taggart Lake
 Two Ocean Lake 
 Yellowstone Lake (largest lake in Wyoming)

Other areas

American Samoa

District of Columbia

 Kingman Lake is a tidal estuary, not a lake

Guam

Northern Mariana Islands

 Hagoi
 Lagona Lake

Puerto Rico

See also

 List of lakes
 List of dams and reservoirs in the United States

References